XHOJF-FM is a radio station on 92.1 FM owned by the municipality of Ocotlán de Morelos in the state of Oaxaca.

History
XHOJF was the second ever radio station in Mexico to be licensed directly to a municipality, after XHCUN-FM in Cancún. It was permitted in 2011, and testing began in early 2013.

References

Spanish-language radio stations
Radio stations in Oaxaca
Radio stations established in 2011
Public radio in Mexico